This is a list of association football clubs based in the Province of Seville  in Spain. (Including defunct clubs and reserves teams)

La Liga

Segunda División

Primera División RFEF

Segunda División RFEF

Tercera División RFEF

References

Warning:La Liga,Segunda División,Primera División RFEF and Segunda División used the wikipedia season of leagues.

Province of Seville
Sport in Andalusia
Seville